Montfortista kirana is a species of sea snail, a marine gastropod mollusk in the family Fissurellidae, the keyhole limpets and slit limpets.

Description
The size of the shell varies between 4.5 mm and 12 mm.

Distribution
This marine species occurs off the Philippines.

References

External links
 To World Register of Marine Species
 

Fissurellidae
Gastropods described in 1963